Jarnołtowo  (German: Groß-Arnsdorf) is a village in the administrative district of Gmina Małdyty, within Ostróda County, Warmian-Masurian Voivodeship, in northern Poland.

It was established around 1308 and first mentioned in 1317 as Arnoldisdorff. In 1329-1335 the church was built. 
Between 1750-1754 Immanuel Kant, a philosopher, worked here as a tutor.

Notable residents
German philosopher Immanuel Kant worked as a tutor in Groß-Arnsdorf between 1750 and 1754.

References

Villages in Ostróda County